The 2015–16 Liberty Flames men's basketball team represented the Liberty University in the 2015–16 NCAA Division I men's basketball season. The team played its home games in Lynchburg, Virginia for the 26th consecutive season at Vines Center, with a capacity of 8,085. The team was led by Ritchie McKay, who was in his third season, but first season since his return to the program. They were members of the Big South Conference. They finished the season 13–19, 10–8 in Big South play to finish in a tie for fifth place. They lost in the quarterfinals of the Big South tournament to UNC Asheville.

Departures

2015–16 Newcomers

John Dawson, originally from Clovis, New Mexico, transferred from Marquette Golden Eagles men's basketball in January and will be eligible to play in after the 2015 fall semester.

Anthony Fields, originally from Detroit, Michigan, graduated from Bradley and will be eligible immediately.  Fields started his career at Wake Forest before transferring to Bradley.  He averaged 1.2 points per game last season for the Braves.  Fields will be a senior.

Hansel Atencia, originally from Colombia, played his high school basketball at Mountain Mission High in Grundy, Virginia.  He averaged 8.5 points, 5.2 assists, 1.7 rebounds and 1.8 steals per game during his senior year.

Lovell Cabbil, originally from Arlington, Texas, played at Mansfield Summit high school where he averaged 23 points, 4 assists, 3 rebounds and 3 steal per game his senior year.

Myo Baxter-Bell, originally from Dayton, Ohio, played at Chaminade Julienne Catholic High school where he averaged 14 points, 6 rebounds and shot 73% from the free throw line his senior year.

Caleb Homesley, originally from Indian Trail, North Carolina was the first commit of the 2015 class, originally recruited by former head coach Dale Layer.

Pre-season

Accolades and Rankings

Events

On March 4, 2015, hours after Liberty's loss in the first round of the Big South Conference tournament, Dale Layer was relieved as head coach of the men's basketball team.  Layer spent 6 seasons as the head coach, taking over when Ritchie McKay left in 2009.

On April 1, 2015, Ritchie McKay was announced as the men's basketball coach at Liberty University.  McKay spent two years as the head coach for the 2007–08 and 2008–09 seasons before leaving to join Tony Bennett at the University of Virginia.  McKay served as the Associate Head Coach for the Cavaliers for 6 seasons before returning to Liberty.

Roster

Roster is subject to change as/if players transfer or leave the program for other reasons.
John Dawson won't be eligible until January due to transfer rules.

Schedule 

|-
!colspan=12 style="background: #0A254E; color:white;"| Regular season

|-
!colspan=12 style="background:#0A254E; color:white;"| Big South tournament

References

Liberty Flames basketball seasons
Liberty
Liberty Fl
Liberty Fl